The Art of Doing: How Superachievers Do What They Do and How They Do It So Well is a 2013 non-fiction book by the journalist Camille Sweeney and the artist Josh Gosfield published by Plume Books, a division of Penguin Group on January 29, 2013.

The book features strategic principles that let to the achievements of over three-dozen highly successful individuals. For the book Sweeney and Gosfield interviewed an eclectic mix of people from the worlds of business, the arts, media, sports and other fields. The subjects of the book include actor Alec Baldwin, Zappos CEO Tony Hsieh, baseball Hall of Famer Yogi Berra, Grammy-winning alternative rock band OK Go, famed dog whisperer Cesar Millan, Tennis great Martina Navratilova and dozens more. Full list below

Contents
In the book's introduction "What Superachievers Have in Common" Sweeney and Gosfield list ten traits they discovered that their interviewees shared: devotion, intelligent persistence, community building, listening, telling a story, testing, managing emotions, evolving, patience and happiness.

There are thirty-six chapters in the book. Each chapter focuses on a single or affiliated group of high achievers at the top of their fields. Each chapter includes a short biography and ten key strategies or principles that led to that achiever or achievers' success story. Sweeney and Gosfield describe their approach to the book not as "theorizing on success Gladwellian-style or offering up some easily digestible quick-tip formulae" but instead as, "going straight to the source and simply asking successful people how they do what they do."

Recognition
The New York Times article by Sweeney and Gosfield "The Secret Ingredient of Success," based on their research was the second most emailed story on the Times
site for the week. The Art of Doing has received coverage by NBC, MSNBC, Smithsonian, Yahoo!, Newsweek/Daily Beast, The Atlanta
Journal Constitution, Fast Company, Psychology Today, "Boing Boing", The Huffington Post, and "BusinessInsider.">

According to WorldCat, the book is held in 210 libraries as of January 2014,

References

External links
 The Art of Doing Website
 CamilleSweeney.com
 JoshGosfield.com

2013 non-fiction books
American non-fiction books
Self-help books
Plume (publisher) books